Chester Noe (born November 3, 1931) is an American former basketball player. He was an all-city center while he played at Washington Preparatory High School in his hometown of Los Angeles, California. Noe played college basketball for the Oregon Ducks from 1950 to 1953 and led the Ducks in scoring during his final two seasons. He was a first-team All-PCC selection and named the Ducks' Most Valuable Player in 1953.

Noe was selected as an Amateur Athletic Union (AAU) All-American while playing for the Everybody's Drug Store team of Eugene, Oregon, in 1953. He was chosen by the Boston Celtics as the 12th overall pick in the 1953 NBA draft but he did not sign with the team as he believed the pay was not worth living so far away from home. Although he never played in the National Basketball Association (NBA), Noe played for the Buchan Bakers of the Northwest Basketball League (NWBL), and the Houston Ada Oilers and Phillips 66ers of the National Industrial Basketball League (NIBL).

After his retirement from playing, Noe worked as a petroleum salesman and tobacconist.

References

External links
College statistics

1931 births
Living people
Amateur Athletic Union men's basketball players
American men's basketball players
Basketball players from Los Angeles
Boston Celtics draft picks
Centers (basketball)
Oregon Ducks men's basketball players
Phillips 66ers players